Mirko Turri (born 29 June 1981 in Verona) is an Italian bobsledder who competed from 203 to 2007. His best Bobsleigh World Cup finish was third in the two-man event at Lake Placid in December 2006.

Turri also finished 19th in the four-man event at the 2007 FIBT World Championships in St. Moritz.

He also finished tied for ninth in the four-man event at the 2010 Winter Olympics in Vancouver, British Columbia, Canada.

References
 
 

1981 births
Bobsledders at the 2010 Winter Olympics
Italian male bobsledders
Living people
Olympic bobsledders of Italy